Mobile Suit Gundam is a video game developed by Sunrise and published by Bandai for the PlayStation.

Gameplay
Mobile Suit Gundam is a first-person shooter.

Reception
Next Generation reviewed the PlayStation version of the game, rating it two stars out of five, and stated that "for people looking for a mildly interesting first-person shooter, this one may be the answer."

Reviews
Famitsu #332 (Apr. 28, 1995)
SuperGamePower (Sep, 1995)

References

1995 video games
First-person shooters
Gundam video games
Japan-exclusive video games
PlayStation (console) games
PlayStation (console)-only games
Video games developed in Japan